Ernesto Parga (born 26 November 1935) is an Argentine water polo player. He competed in the men's tournament at the 1960 Summer Olympics.

References

1935 births
Living people
Argentine male water polo players
Olympic water polo players of Argentina
Water polo players at the 1960 Summer Olympics
Sportspeople from Buenos Aires